This is a chronological list of the founding of lacrosse clubs.

Nineteenth century

Oldest team by country

See also
 Lacrosse
 History of Lacrosse
 Federation of International Lacrosse

References

Oldest lacrosse teams
Lacrosse teams
Oldest
Oldest lacrosse teams